Meharia incurvariella is a moth in the family Cossidae. It is found in Algeria, Morocco, Iran, Afghanistan and Pakistan.

Subspecies
Meharia incurvariella incurvariella (Algeria, Morocco)
Meharia incurvariella persica (Wiltshire, 1946) (Iran, Afghanistan, Pakistan)

References

Moths described in 1915
Meharia